The Canal de Marans à La Rochelle, also known as Canal de Marans, Canal de Rompsay or Canal de La Rochelle depending on the location, is a French canal in the Charente-Maritime department connecting the city of La Rochelle with the town of Marans. It also connects the river of the Sèvre Niortaise to the harbour at La Rochelle. The canal goes through the communes of Dompierre-sur-Mer, Andilly and Sainte-Soulle. It is 24.5 km long, with 4 locks, and has a total level change of 1.7 m. It has a width of 5.2 m.

The canal was built in the 19th century in order to foster trade between the two cities. It was part of a great project of a North-South canal connecting the river Loire to the Adour. The project was ordered by imperial decision of Napoleon I on July 17, 1805, with the objective of connecting Niort with La Rochelle. It was started in 1806, but only open in 1875, and only reached La Rochelle in 1888. It was built with the forced labour of prisoners. When it was completed however, the advent of the train (with the establishment of a track between Nantes and La Rochelle) meant that the canal fell into disuse. Navigation on the canal was totally stopped after the Second World War. It is today not navigable. Today the canal allows for picturesque walks between the two cities. It is renowned for its flora and fauna.

The waters of the canal discharge into the Maubec reservoir at La Rochelle, just before the tidal bassin, and its waters contribute to scour the harbour and navigable channels.

Photos

See also
List of canals in France

Notes

References
 Service départemental de l'architecture et du patrimoine de Charente-Maritime. 

Marans
Buildings and structures in Charente-Maritime
Tourist attractions in Charente-Maritime
Transport in Nouvelle-Aquitaine
Canals opened in 1875